Gradski Stadion Žepče is a multi-use stadium in Žepče, Bosnia and Herzegovina.  It is currently used mostly for football matches and is the home ground of NK Žepče.  The stadium holds 4,000 people.

References 

Football venues in Bosnia and Herzegovina
Žepče